The slaty-backed forest falcon (Micrastur mirandollei) is a species of bird of prey in subfamily Herpetotherinae of family Falconidae, the falcons and caracaras. It is found in Costa Rica, Panama, and every mainland South American country except Argentina, Chile, Paraguay, and Uruguay.

Taxonomy and systematics

The slaty-backed, collared, and Buckley's forest falcons are sister species. The slaty-backed forest falcon is monotypic. The population
in Central America and western Colombia and Ecuador has at times been treated as subspecies M. m. extimus but this separation has not been widely recognized.

Description

Adults have slate gray upperparts, and are darker on the crown and lighter on the cheeks. Their throat and underparts are white to cream, and plain but for a few dark feather shafts making streaks. Their tail is dark slate gray with a white tip and three narrow white bars that often are indistinct. Their iris is yellowish brown to dark brown, its cere greenish yellow, and its legs and feet bright yellow. Juveniles have dark brownish gray upperparts and off-white to yellowish buff underparts with a scaly appearance.

Distribution and habitat

The slaty-backed forest falcon is found from Costa Rica through Panama and western Colombia into western Ecuador's Esmeraldas Province. A separate, much larger, range is found in the Amazon Basin from eastern Colombia, eastern Ecuador, eastern Peru, and northern Bolivia east through Venezuela, the Guianas, and northern Brazil to the Atlantic coast. It mostly inhabits lowland rainforest, favoring undisturbed areas, but also occurs in mature secondary forest and sometimes in rather open landscapes. It is often found near watercourses. In elevation it occurs as high as  but is mostly below .

Behavior

Movement

As far as is known the slaty-backed forest falcon is a year-round resident throughout its range.

Feeding

The slaty-backed forest falcon's diet has not been detailed but is known to include birds, lizards, and snakes. It mostly hunts from the understorey to the forest's mid level but will go to the ground. It might follow army ant swarms to capture smaller birds feeding on what flees the ants.

Breeding

Nothing is known about the slaty-backed forest falcon's breeding biology. It is assumed to nest in tree cavities like other Micrastur forest falcons.

Vocalization

The slaty-backed forest falcon's primary vocalization is a "chanting series of 8-13 nasal, shouting kiiih or kaaah notes". It also makes a "high-pitched eek-eek-eek...", apparently to provoke small passerines to mob it so it can catch one.

Status

The IUCN has assessed the slaty-backed forest falcon as being of Least Concern. It has a very large range and an estimated population of at least 50,000 mature individuals, though the latter is believed to be decreasing. No immediate threats have been identified. It is "[w]idely distributed, but everywhere rare and perhaps patchily present".

References

slaty-backed forest falcon
Birds of Costa Rica
Birds of Panama
Birds of the Amazon Basin
Birds of the Guianas
Birds of the Atlantic Forest
slaty-backed forest falcon
Taxonomy articles created by Polbot